Simo Halinen (born 1963) is a Finnish film director, screenwriter, actor and author.

Halinen graduated from the School of Arts, Design and Architecture at Aalto University in 1995. Halinen released his first novel Idänsydänsimpukka in 2004 and a follow-up Lemmenomenia in 2008. He wrote and directed his first full-length feature film Cyclomania in 2001, and in 2013 he returned with Open Up to Me. In addition to his film work, Halinen has also written and directed for television.

Selected filmography 

Variksenpelätti (1989)
Vanhus näki unta leijonista (1990)
Laihan miehen balladi (1993)
Minerva (1997)
Cyclomania (2001)
Hokkasen näköinen nainen (television, 2004)
Kultainen noutaja (television, 2007)
Open Up to Me (2013)

References

External links 
 

1963 births
Finnish film directors
Living people
Writers from Helsinki
Male actors from Helsinki